The Equitation School is a centre of excellence of the Defence Forces dedicated to competing at the highest level of international equestrian competition. It is based at McKee Barracks in the Phoenix Park in Dublin.

Brief history
The Army Equitation School was founded in 1926 by Judge William E. Wylie, a prominent member of the Royal Dublin Society, Quartermaster general Colonel Michael Hogan and President of the Executive Council (modern-day Taoiseach) William T. Cosgrave.

Russian riding instructor Colonel Paul Rodzianko, appointed Chief Instructor of the Equitation School (1928 to 1931) by the Minister for Defence, was instrumental in the early competitive successes of the Equitation School. Between 1931 and 1939 the Equitation School went on to win 20 Nations Cups in the cities of Lucerne, Dublin, Boston, Toronto, New York City, Nice, Amsterdam, London, and Aachen.

Overview
Army riders have represented Ireland at the Olympic Games, Show Jumping World Championships and European Show Jumping Championships in the disciplines of show jumping and three-day eventing. The Equitation School has helped the Irish team to numerous victories in the Aga Khan Trophy at the RDS Arena. All Army riders are of officer rank and compete only on Irish-bred sport horses.

The Equitation School, through its involvement with the Racing Academy and Centre of Education (RACE), has trained such jockeys as Johnny Murtagh, Kieren Fallon, Jimmy Quinn and Conor O’Dwyer.

The school also has significant influence on national and supranational equestrian bodies. Both serving and retired Army Equitation School officers sit on committees and boards of Horse Sport Ireland (HSI), International Federation for Equestrian Sports (FEI), Equestrian Federation of Ireland (EFI), Show Jumping Association of Ireland, Eventing Ireland and the RDS Equestrian Committee. The Equitation School has contributed to the development of training and coaching in the Irish and international sport horse industry, with a number of programmes created by the school being adopted by national and international bodies as the standard.

The Equitation School took in over €73,000 in prize money at national and international events in 2012. The budget to run the school for 2012 amounted to €2.26 million. 50% of prize money is shared with the school's riders. 100% of the costs of the school is paid by the Irish taxpayer. The Irish horse sport industry is worth an estimated €800 million to the Irish economy.

Current riding officers

See also
 Aga Khan Trophy

References

External links
 The Equitation School
 Equitation School brochure (2016)

Dublin Horse Show
Irish Army
Military units and formations of the Irish Army
Military units and formations established in 1926
1926 establishments in Ireland